7-Deoxyloganic acid is an iridoid monoterpene.  7-Deoxyloganic acid is produced from 7-deoxyloganetic acid by the enzyme 7-deoxyloganetic acid glucosyltransferase (7-DLGT).  The metabolite is a substrate for the enzyme 7-deoxyloganic acid hydroxylase (7-DLH) which synthesizes loganic acid.

References

Iridoid glycosides
Carboxylic acids
Glucosides
Cyclopentanes